David Thomas Winfield (born 24 March 1988) is an English semi-professional footballer who plays as a defender for  club Chelmsford City.

Career

Aldershot Town
Born in Aldershot, Hampshire, Winfield came through the ranks of the Aldershot Town youth team and was loaned out to Isthmian League Division Two club Chertsey Town in the 2004–05 season. He signed a one-year professional contract with Aldershot on 16 July 2005 and joined Isthmian League Premier Division club Staines Town on loan in early 2006. Winfield made his debut in a 3–1 home defeat to Wealdstone on 2 February 2006 and had made seven appearances when returning to Aldershot in March.

He won two trophies with Aldershot Town, winning the Conference League Cup and Conference Premier in 2007–08. Unfortunately, a knee injury sustained in the Conference League Cup final against Rushden & Diamonds resulted in him missing pre-season training ahead of the Shots' first season in League Two.

Having begun training at the end of 2008, Winfield was loaned out to Salisbury City of the Conference Premier in January 2009 on a one-month deal that saw Andy Sandell move the other way on a permanent deal. Winfield made his Football League debut in Aldershot's 2–1 defeat to Exeter City in February 2009.

Wycombe Wanderers
Winfield signed a two-year deal for Wycombe Wanderers upon the expiry of his contract in June 2010, and a tribunal ruled that Wycombe pay a fee of £25,000 plus a 20% sell-on clause. He made 40 appearances for Wycombe in 2010–11 as they won promotion to League One after finishing in third place in League Two.

Shrewsbury Town
Winfield turned down a new contract at Wycombe at the end of 2012–13, to join League One club Shrewsbury Town on a free transfer on 12 June 2013. However, he picked up a hamstring injury late in pre-season that delayed his availability for selection until September 2013. Having played 30 minutes of a reserve match against Oldham Athletic, Winfield eventually made the substitutes' bench for an away match at Crawley Town on 14 September 2013, and made his first team debut away at Bradford City two weeks later, getting sent off for two bookable offences in a 2–1 defeat. Following Shrewsbury's relegation from to League Two, Winfield was released on 2 June 2014, having come to an agreement to end his contract early.

York City

Following his release from Shrewsbury, Winfield joined League Two rivals York City on a two-year contract on 16 June 2014. He made his debut in a 1–0 home defeat to Doncaster Rovers in the League Cup first round on 12 August 2014. Winfield made only five appearances for York before joining their League Two rivals AFC Wimbledon on a one-month loan on 12 February 2015. He made his debut two days later in a 2–0 away defeat to Shrewsbury before the loan was extended in March 2015. He had made seven appearances for AFC Wimbledon when York recalled him on 19 March 2015 after an injury to Stéphane Zubar. Winfield left York after rejecting a new contract in June 2016.

Ebbsfleet United
Winfield joined National League South club Ebbsfleet United on 9 June 2016. He scored in the 76th minute of Ebbsfleet's 2–1 win over Chelmsford City in the 2017 National League South play-off Final, which saw the club promoted to the National League.

Later career
On 2 October 2019, Winfield signed for Chelmsford City.

On 6 December 2019, after two goals in ten appearances in all competitions, Winfield moved up a division to sign for National League club Bromley.

Winfield signed for Romford prior to the 2020–21 season, making six appearances for the club in all competitions, before the season was curtailed due to the COVID-19 pandemic.

On 10 July 2021, Winfield returned to Chelmsford City.

Career statistics

Honours
Aldershot Town
Conference League Cup: 2007–08
Conference Premier: 2007–08

Wycombe Wanderers
Football League Two third-place promotion: 2010–11

Ebbsfleet United
National League South play-offs: 2017

Individual
York City Clubman of the Year: 2015–16

References

External links

Profile at the Ebbsfleet United F.C. website

1988 births
Living people
Sportspeople from Aldershot
Footballers from Hampshire
English footballers
Association football defenders
Aldershot Town F.C. players
Chertsey Town F.C. players
Staines Town F.C. players
Salisbury City F.C. players
Wycombe Wanderers F.C. players
Shrewsbury Town F.C. players
York City F.C. players
AFC Wimbledon players
Ebbsfleet United F.C. players
Chelmsford City F.C. players
Bromley F.C. players
Romford F.C. players
National League (English football) players
Isthmian League players
English Football League players